The 1999–2000 season was the 96th season in the history of Bayer 04 Leverkusen and the club's 21st consecutive season in the top flight of German football. In addition to the domestic league, Leverkusen participated in this season's editions of the DFB-Pokal, the UEFA Champions League, and the UEFA Cup.

Players

Transfers

Pre-season and friendlies

Competitions

Overall record

Bundesliga

League table

Results summary

Results by round

Matches

DFB-Pokal

DFB-Ligapokal

UEFA Champions League

Group stage

UEFA Cup

References

Bayer 04 Leverkusen seasons
Bayer 04 Leverkusen